Obtusifoliol is a metabolic intermediate of sterols made by certain fungi. It can be converted to delta8,14-sterol by the enzyme ERG11 (CYP51F1).

References

Sterols